Aaron Hillis is an American writer, film critic, director, film festival programmer, and curator.

Career

Hillis has been active in independent film, especially within the fields of indie festivals, exhibitions, indie film distribution and programming, filmmaking, marketing, and journalism. As a film journalist, he has written film reviews and features articles and conducted hundreds of interviews with celebrities. He wrote, among others, for The Village Voice, Vice, Variety, Vanity Fair, LA Weekly, Indiewire, Filmmaker Magazine, GreenCine Daily (editor from 2009 to 2013), and Spin. Furthermore, Hillis is a frequent moderator of panels in the indie film world.

Between 2006 and 2009, Hillis was the vice-president of Benten Films, a boutique DVD label, founded by Andrew Grant. Responsible for acquisitions, art direction, disc production and marketing, releases include Joe Swanberg's LOL (2006), Aaron Katz's Dance Party USA and Quiet City (2007), Matthias Glasner's The Free Will (2008).

In 2007, Hillis directed the documentary feature Fish Kill Flea (together with Brian M. Cassidy and Jennifer Loeber). The film premiered at SXSW where it was praised by Premiere Magazine as "one of SXSW's pleasant surprises, with a great, early Errol Morris feel for American weirdness. (Premiere Magazine) and as "a wistful, thought-provoking rumination on the cost of progress. (Film Threat) gave a similarly positive review, calling it "a wistful, thought-provoking rumination on the cost of progress."

Hillis is one of the programmers at Cucalorus Film Festival (in Wilmington, North Carolina), where he curates the "Convulsions" genre program since 2013.

Between 2012 and 2018, Hillis owned Video Free Brooklyn, a DVD and Blu-ray rental boutique. The store was awarded the title of "Best Video Store in NYC" on three occasions between 2012–2013, by Time Out NY, The Village Voice, The L Magazine. In 2016, Hillis sold the library to the Alamo Drafthouse in Brooklyn.
The 2019 documentary At the Video Store by James Westby features a conversation with Hillis about his time as a video rental store owner.

Since 2020, Hillis has been curating and hosting "Playtime with Hillis," a Zoom screening series of rare cinema. Guests included Paul Schrader, Alice Cooper, Steve Buscemi, Rian Johnson, "Weird Al" Yankovic,  Robert Townsend, Heather Matarazzo, Joe Dante, Robyn Hitchcock, Guinevere Turner, Alessandro Nivola, and band Sparks.

References

External links

 

Living people
Year of birth missing (living people)
American film critics

Writers from New York City
American male journalists
Film curators
American film directors
American documentary film directors